Rye Meads is a  biological Site of Special Scientific Interest (SSSI) in Rye House, Hoddesdon, Hertfordshire. 
It is one of series of wetlands and reservoirs situated along the River Lea, to the north-east of London.
It is part of the Lea Valley Ramsar site (a group of internationally important wetland sites) and a Special Protection Area.

The SSSI is divided into three areas. North of Rye Road is the Rye Meads nature reserve, which is open to the public. The western half of this nature reserve, next to the River Lea in the Lee Valley Regional Park, is managed by the Royal Society for the Protection of Birds (RSPB). The eastern half is managed by the Hertfordshire and Middlesex Wildlife Trust (HMWT). The SSSI also includes a meadow and lagoons owned by Thames Water south of Rye Road which is not open to the public. 

The RSPB reserve has ten birdwatching hides, trails and a visitor centre. Birds include kingfisher, snipe, green sandpiper, shoveler, gadwall and tufted duck.

The HMWT site is an ancient flood meadow which has a variety of habitats including reedbed, marshy grassland and fen. It is grazed by ponies and water buffalo.

The entrance to the nature reserve is on Rye Road. There is a path around the site, but a one-way turnstile blocks wheelchairs and pushchairs, and only allows access from the RSPB half to the HMWT area, not vice versa.

References

Royal Society for the Protection of Birds reserves in England
Meadows in Hertfordshire
Nature reserves in Hertfordshire
Hoddesdon
Lee Valley Park
Sites of Special Scientific Interest in Hertfordshire
Herts and Middlesex Wildlife Trust reserves
East Hertfordshire District